The 2007–08 New Jersey Nets season was the 41st season, 32nd in the NBA basketball in East Rutherford, New Jersey. In midseason, All-Star point guard Jason Kidd was shipped to the Dallas Mavericks, the team where he began his career. He would later help the Mavericks win their first ever NBA championship in 2011. Kidd would later return to the Nets, in Brooklyn, as their head coach for the 2013–14 season.

Key dates prior to the start of the season:
 The 2007 NBA draft took place in New York City on June 28.
 The free agency period then began in July 2007.

Draft picks

Roster

Regular season

Standings

Record vs. opponents

Game log

Game log

November
Record: ; Home: ; Road:

December
Record: ; Home: ; Road:

January
Record: ; Home: ; Road:

February
Record: ; Home: ; Road:

March
Record: ; Home: ; Road:

April
Record: ; Home: ; Road:

 Green background indicates win.
 Red background indicates regulation loss.
 White background indicates overtime/shootout loss.

Player stats

Regular season 

|-
| 
| 26 || 3 || 6.3 || .323 || .158 || .500 || .5 || .3 || .00 || .04 || 2.0
|-
| 
| 50 || 2 || 11.0 || .364 || .333 || .667 || 1.3 || 1.5 || .56 || .04 || 2.5
|-
| 
| 70 || 53 || 25.3 || style=";"|.548 || .000 || .456 || style=";"|7.3 || .8 || .51 || .87 || 8.2
|-
| 
| 76 || 72 || 38.9 || .456 || .359 || .816 || 6.0 || 5.1 || 1.22 || .43 || 21.3
|-
| 
| 79 || 23 || 16.4 || .522 || .000 || .543 || 5.0 || .5 || .33 || 1.11 || 2.9
|-
| 
| 64 || 61 || 31.6 || .463 || .335 || style=";"|.824 || 2.7 || style=";"|5.8 || style=";"|1.41 || .16 || 14.8
|-
| 
| 63 || 6 || 12.3 || .422 || .222 || .700 || 1.3 || .7 || .21 || .05 || 2.0
|-
| 
| style=";"|82 || style=";"|82 || style=";"|39.0 || .466 || .362 || .798 || 4.2 || 3.1 || .93 || .26 || style=";"|22.6
|-
| 
| 45 || 38 || 18.0 || .410 || .000 || .754 || 4.4 || .6 || .20 || .38 || 6.6
|-
|Jamaal Magloire
|24
|2
|10.8
|.306
|.000
|.452
|3.4
|0.3
|0.0
|0.4
|1.8
|-
|Boštjan Nachbar
|75
|1
|22.1
|.402
|.359
|.786
|3.5
|1.2
|0.6
|0.3
|9.8
|-
| 
| 56 || 4 || 15.1 || .509 || .000 || .670 || 3.6 || .5 || .27 || .96 || 6.1
|-
| 
| 53 || 7 || 16.1 || .379 || style=";"|.380 || .787 || 1.9 || 2.6 || .47 || .06 || 5.9
|-
| 
| 73 || 29 || 17.5 || .538 || .000 || .609 || 4.4 || .4 || .38 || style=";"|1.45 || 5.6
|}
*Total for entire season including previous team(s)

*Bold indicates Team leader

Awards and records

Records

Milestones

Transactions
The Nets have been involved in the following transactions during the 2007–08 season.

Trades

See also
 2007–08 NBA season

External links

New Jersey Nets season
New Jersey Nets seasons
New Jersey Nets
New Jersey Nets
21st century in East Rutherford, New Jersey
Meadowlands Sports Complex